The siege of Salvador was a siege that took place between April and May 1638, during the Dutch–Portuguese War and Eighty Years' War. The governor of the Dutch colony in Brazil, John Maurice, Prince of Nassau-Siegen, commanding the army of the Dutch West India Company, with vastly superior forces and a supporting fleet under Johan van der Mast, put the city of Salvador under siege. The Portuguese and Spanish defenders, commanded by Giovanni di San Felice, Count of Bagnolo, and Luís Barbalho, managed to resist the Dutch attacks until they gave up taking the city and withdrew with several casualties.

See also
 History of Brazil
 Colonial Brazil
 Dutch Brazil

References

Sources
 

History of Salvador, Bahia
1638 in South America
Salvador
Salvador
Salvador
Salvador I
Salvador
Salvador